is a Japanese professional golfer.

Yuhara played on the Japan Golf Tour, winning seven times. He also provided commentary and motion capture for the game Masters '98: Harukanaru Augusta.

Professional wins (8)

Japan Golf Tour wins (7)

*Note: The 2002 Hisamitsu-KBC Augusta was shortened to 54 holes due to weather.

Japan Golf Tour playoff record (1–3)

Japan Senior PGA Tour wins (1)
2010 Koujun Classic Senior Tournament

Team appearances
Nissan Cup (representing Japan): 1986 (winners)
Dunhill Cup (representing Japan): 1987, 1992

External links

 

Japanese male golfers
Japan Golf Tour golfers
Sportspeople from Tokyo
1957 births
Living people